Ari Benjamin Meyers (born 1972 in New York) is an American artist and composer.

Meyers received his training as a composer and conductor at the Juilliard School, Yale University, and Peabody Institute. His practice includes creating musical performances for the stage and exhibition spaces. He has collaborated with artists including Tino Sehgal and Dominique Gonzalez-Foerster; bands such as Einstürzende Neubauten and Chicks on Speed; and classical ensembles including the Bavarian Radio Symphony Orchestra and the Hong Kong New Music Ensemble.

References

1972 births
American male artists
American male composers
Juilliard School alumni
Living people
Peabody Institute alumni
Yale University alumni